St. Francisville may refer to a place in the United States:

 St. Francisville, Illinois
 St. Francisville, Louisiana
 New Roads-St. Francisville Ferry, crossing the Mississippi River
 St. Francisville, Missouri